Mohana Silai is a Tamil language historical novel written by Sandilyan. It was first published as chapters in the Tamil weekly magazine Kungumam in 1981. The historical background is set at the time of Vijayalaya's establishment of the Imperial Cholas reign by capturing Vanchi and Tanjore.

In the novel, along with Vijayalaya, other historical characters like Adithya, Sthanuravi (a Chera king), Vanasastri (astronomer) Sankaranarayanan and Perumpidugu Mutharayar  and fictional characters like Idhayakumaran, Achuthaperaiyar, Ilayavel, Kannazhagi and Devi are present.

Plot summary
The story begins with Idhayakumaran entering the city of Vanchi, the second capital of Cheras. He is stopped at the entrance by the guards who does not allow him to enter after knowing that he is from Chola country. But Idhayakumaran gallops in his horse into the city. He finds a beautiful ivory statue of a dancing female in the woods within the city. Just as he took the statue in his hand he hears the Chera princess Ranjani ordering her guards to arrest him for stealing the statue. Idhayakumaran escapes from the situation by taking the princess as his hostage. He later releases her and informs her that the secret of her birth will be revealed today in the place of the royal jeweler.

The princess meets a stranger along with Achuthaperaiyar, the royal jeweler. Idhayakumaran meets them there along with the statue. Achuthaperaiyar introduces the stranger as Vijayalayan and he is her father. Vijayalayan calls her Kannazhagi. Vijayalayan also mentions that he has just captured Vanchi.
He explains that the statue was made by Ilamcetcenni, the legendary Chola king. He also reveals that Achuthaperaiyar as his Chief Minister, and explains that her mother's name is Bhoodevi and he had married her when he was the king of the then tiny Chola country ruling the region around Uraiyur.

Once when Vijayalayan was in Pandyan country with Achuthaperaiyar for a week, the Mutharayars of Kalabhras clan raided Uraiyur and tried to abduct Bhoodevi. But she stabbed and killed herself with a dagger. The raiders took with them the three-year-old Kannazhagi. When Vijayalaya Chola returned he vowed to destroy the clan of the raiders. A week later the Chola king went to Kanchi and met the Pallava king and made Cholas a feudal kingdom of the Pallavas. The Pallava king made him the Commander of Pallava army. Vijayalaya led many successful invasion into the Kalabhras country and started to look for you. When she was found (after fifteen years) in Vanchi, Vijayalayan sent Achuthaperaiyar there - which resulted in Vanchi being captured by the Cholas.

Later Aditya and Idhakumaran infiltrates the Mutharayar stronghold Chandraleka (Senthalai), where they meet the king Perumpidugu Mutharayar, his son Maran Parameshwaran Mutharayar and daughter Devi (with whom Aditya falls in love). They then devise the plan for Chola invasion of Tanjore and Senthalai. The story ends with Cholas under Vijayala capturing Senthalai and Tanjore and Vijayalaya changing his capital from Uraiyur to Tanjore.

References

Tamil history
Tamil novels
Tamil-language literature
Novels first published in serial form
Works originally published in Indian magazines
Novels set in the Chola Empire
Novels by Sandilyan
Indian historical novels in Tamil
Novels set in Tamil Nadu